The men's finweight (−54 kilograms) event at the 2006 Asian Games took place on 7 December 2006 at Qatar SC Indoor Hall, Doha, Qatar.

Schedule
All times are Arabia Standard Time (UTC+03:00)

Results

Final

Top half

Bottom half

References
Results

External links
Official website

Taekwondo at the 2006 Asian Games